Howard Hodges, III (born May 29, 1981 in Copperas Cove, Texas) is a former Canadian football defensive tackle. He was signed by the San Diego Chargers as an undrafted free agent in 2004. He played college football at Iowa.

Hodges has also played for the Nashville Kats, Hamilton Tiger-Cats and Calgary Stampeders.

External links
Just Sports Stats
Calgary Stampeders bio
Iowa Hawkeyes bio

1981 births
Living people
People from Copperas Cove, Texas
American football defensive ends
American football linebackers
American players of Canadian football
Canadian football defensive linemen
Iowa Hawkeyes football players
San Diego Chargers players
Frankfurt Galaxy players
Nashville Kats players
Hamilton Tiger-Cats players
Calgary Stampeders players